The Pastonian interglacial, now called the Pastonian Stage (from Paston, Norfolk), is the name for an early or middle Pleistocene stage used in the British Isles. It precedes the Beestonian Stage and follows the Pre-Pastonian Stage. Unfortunately the precise age of this stage cannot yet be defined in terms of absolute dating or MIS stages. The Pre-Pastonian Stage is equivalent to the Tiglian C5-6 Stage of Europe and the Pre-Illinoian I glaciation of the early Pre-Illinoian Stage of North America.
 
Deciduous woodland, increased including species such as Hornbeam (Carpinus), Elm (Ulmus), Hazel (Corylus), and Spruce (Picea). Towards the end of the period, there is evidence for a fall in sea levels and an increase in grassland species.

References

External links
anonymous, 2007, Global correlation tables for the Quaternary, Subcommission on Quaternary Stratigraphy, Department of Geography, University of Cambridge, Cambridge, England

Further reading
Bowen, D.Q., 1978, Quaternary geology: a stratigraphic framework for multidisciplinary work.  Pergamon Press, Oxford, United Kingdom. 221 pp. 
Ehlers, J., P. L. Gibbard, and J. Rose, eds., 1991, Glacial deposits in Great Britain and Ireland. Balkema, Rotterdam. 580 pp 
Mangerud, J., J. Ehlers, and P. Gibbard, 2004, Quaternary Glaciations: Extent and Chronology 1: Part I Europe, Elsevier, Amsterdam.

See also
Ice age
Glacial period
Last glacial period
Timeline of glaciation

Glaciology
Pleistocene
Interglacials